Alexander Yi (born February 27, 1982) is a retired American soccer defender who last played for FC Dallas of Major League Soccer. He is currently head coach for Academy of Art Urban Knights.

Playing career
As a teenager, Yi was a member of Under-17 national team, and as such was part of the inaugural class of the USSF's Bradenton Academy, along with other players such as Landon Donovan, DaMarcus Beasley, and Oguchi Onyewu. Upon graduating, he matriculated to UCLA, where he played college soccer in 2000 and 2001, where he started in 41 games and was named a third team All-American as a sophomore. He was named PAC-10 Player of the Year.

Following his sophomore year Yi left UCLA to pursue a professional career in Europe; he signed with Royal Antwerp of the Belgian First Division, a feeder club of Manchester United, before the start of the 2002–03 season. Yi disappointingly only appeared in four matches for Antwerp in the 2002–03 season, and, after appearing in only seven for the struggling club in the subsequent season, was released from his contract to pursue opportunities in America.

Yi was coveted by several teams upon his return to the United States, most notably his hometown D.C. United, but was eventually allocated to F.C. Dallas through a weighted lottery on January 12, 2005.

Yi has played for the U-17, U-20, and U-23 United States youth national teams, and played in the 2001 Football World Youth Championship. His father, Kyom Yi, played for the South Korean national team at the youth level.

Coaching career
Alex Yi retired from soccer in April 2008. He struggled with injury and decided to head back to school, applying to UCLA and UT-Austin. Eventually, he was hired as an assistant coach at the University of Dayton, where he became a full-time student.

References

External links
 
  Alex Yi at University of Dayton

1982 births
Living people
American expatriate soccer players
Royal Antwerp F.C. players
FC Dallas players
Soccer players from Alexandria, Virginia
American people of Korean descent
Sportspeople from Alexandria, Virginia
UCLA Bruins men's soccer players
Dayton Flyers men's soccer coaches
Major League Soccer players
United States men's youth international soccer players
United States men's under-20 international soccer players
United States men's under-23 international soccer players
LA Galaxy non-playing staff
Association football defenders
American soccer players
American soccer coaches